Batliboi Ltd is  one of the oldest Indian engineering companies, founded in 1892. The company is involved in Machine Tools, Textile Air Engineering, Textile Machinery, Air Conditioning, Environmental Engineering, Wind Energy, Electrical Engineering, and International Marketing and Logistics. Batliboi Ltd. has been registered in Mumbai Stock Exchange.

History 
It was founded by Jehangir Framji Batliboi. In 1916, the company was acquired by Bhogilal Leherchand, a diamond trader. It went public in 1978.

References

Companies listed on the Bombay Stock Exchange
Technology companies established in 1892
Technology companies of India
Indian companies established in 1892
Companies based in Bangalore